Alvdal Church is a parish church of the Church of Norway in Alvdal Municipality in Innlandet county, Norway. It is located in the village of Alvdal. It is the church for the Alvdal parish which is part of the Nord-Østerdal prosti (deanery) in the Diocese of Hamar. The white, wooden church was built in an long church design in 1861 using plans drawn up by the architect Christian Heinrich Grosch. The church seats about 450 people.

History
The first church in Alvdal was built in 1639 (there is some circumstantial evidence that a medieval stave church stood here before 1639, but that is not proven). The church from 1639 was a wooden long church that was dedicated to Saint Nicholas. The church was consecrated in 1639 by the Bishop Oluf Boesen. Prior to the construction of this church, the people of Alvdal travelled to the nearby Tylldalen Church. In 1709, the old church was torn down. From 1709 to 1715, a new, larger timber-framed long church was built on the same site.

The new church was designed by Christian Heinrich Grosch. The new church was consecrated on 12 October 1861. After the new church was completed, the old church was torn down. In 1867, the new church got exterior siding and it was painted. In 1882, a new altarpiece was built by Carl Frithjof Smith (before that time, a large wooden cross stood above the altar.

Media gallery

See also
List of churches in Hamar

References

Alvdal
Churches in Innlandet
Long churches in Norway
Wooden churches in Norway
19th-century Church of Norway church buildings
Churches completed in 1861
17th-century establishments in Norway